Anton "Tony" Hulman Jr. (February 11, 1901 – October 27, 1977) was an American businessman from Terre Haute, Indiana, who bought the Indianapolis Motor Speedway in 1945 and brought racing back to the famous race course after a four-year hiatus following World War II.

Early life and entry into the family business
Hulman was born in 1901 in Terre Haute. He was educated at St. Benedict's School at Terre Haute, Lawrenceville School in New Jersey and Worcester Academy in Massachusetts. Hulman participated in the high hurdles and the pole vault at Worcester.

He served with the American Red Cross Ambulance Corps during World War I at the age of 17.

Upon graduation from Yale's Sheffield Scientific School in 1924, Hulman returned to Terre Haute to work for Hulman & Company, the family business run by his father Anton Hulman, Sr. However, Anton, Sr. told his managers, "Don't give Tony a place in the business. Let him work for it."

Despite this, Tony rose far and fast. By 1926, he was the company's sales manager, and by 1931, at the age of 30, succeeded his father as company president.

Clabber Girl

Hulman's first project was developing a 10-year plan for an ad campaign that would take Clabber Girl's top product, baking powder, to national prominence. Salesmen traveled around the country posting billboards along the roadside and going door-to-door inviting women to try Clabber Girl, which successfully boosted product sales. An original billboard that reads "Five Minutes to Terre Haute, Home of Clabber Girl Baking Powder" and has a clock at the top is still visible along US 40 outside of Terre Haute, Indiana and is considered a local landmark.

Indianapolis Motor Speedway

Hulman is probably best known for buying the dilapidated Indianapolis Motor Speedway from a group led by World War I flying ace Eddie Rickenbacker immediately after World War II, seeing it as a way to promote Clabber Girl. Influenced by three-time Indy 500 winner Wilbur Shaw (who became the track's president in the early years of the Hulman regime), Hulman made numerous improvements to the track in time for the race to be held in 1946.

Following Shaw's death in a plane crash on October 30, 1954, Hulman stepped into his soon-to-be-familiar role as the "face" of the Speedway.

He followed the tradition of launching the Indianapolis 500 with the command, "Gentlemen, start your engines!" Into the 1970s, despite the fact he'd given the command so many times before, he would always practice it extensively beforehand, and on race day, he would invariably pull a card containing the famous words: "Gentlemen, start your engines!" from the pocket of his suit as he stepped to the microphone. Luke Walton, who with Wilbur Shaw had founded the Indianapolis Motor Speedway Radio Network, was for many years a sportscaster and worked annually with Hulman (and later with Mrs. Hulman) to ensure each word was delivered with the proper emphasis.

Family and philanthropy

Hulman married Mary Fendrich, the daughter of Fendrich Cigar Company owner John H. Fendrich, in 1926. Their first child, a daughter named Mary, died just hours after her birth in 1930. In 1934, the couple's second daughter, also named Mary, but better known as "Mari", was born. Mari would later give Tony and Mary four grandchildren. Their sole grandson, Anton Hulman "Tony" George, would carry on the family's racing and business traditions.

The Hulmans were well known in Indiana for their philanthropy and dedication to higher education; Terre Haute's Rose Polytechnic Institute received gifts of millions of dollars over the years. The Hulmans' generosity led the board of Rose Polytechnic to rename the school Rose-Hulman Institute of Technology in the couple's honor in 1971. Indiana State's Hulman Center arena (opened in 1973) and Hulman Memorial Student Union (completed in the mid-1990s) for the couple carry the Hulman name in recognition of the family's donations for their construction. Mari Hulman George established a Center for Equine Studies at Saint Mary-of-the-Woods College, west of Terre Haute.

Death
The 1977 Indianapolis 500 would be memorable for many reasons. A. J. Foyt won his fourth "500" that day, and Foyt invited Hulman to ride with him on the back of the Oldsmobile Delta 88 pace car. The pair were photographed smiling and waving to the fans. It was one of the few, perhaps only, times Hulman had ever ridden on the back of the pace car with the winner; most other times he had sat in the passenger seat. It would be the final time most people saw Hulman publicly.

At 76 years old, Hulman appeared to be in good health; he was always busy maintaining his business interests in Indianapolis and Terre Haute. In mid-October 1977, he hosted the annual Speedway press dinner. A few days later, though, he and his close friend, Hoosier sportscaster Chris Schenkel, were the grand marshals for the Fall Festival parade in nearby Martinsville, Indiana, where Hulman refused Schenkel's offer of his coat in the cool autumn weather. On the night of October 27, 1977, Hulman died of heart failure caused by a ruptured aortic aneurysm on the operating table in St. Vincent's Hospital in Indianapolis. He is buried in Calvary Cemetery, along with other members of his family.

Award
He was inducted in the Motorsports Hall of Fame of America in 1991.
He is a member of the Indiana Football Hall of Fame.
He was inducted in the International Motorsports Hall of Fame in 1990.
He received the Golden Plate Award of the American Academy of Achievement in 1975.

Other business interests

Hulman went on a buying spree beginning in the 1930s, purchasing a string of Coca-Cola bottling plants across Indiana (which were later consolidated to Indianapolis), utility companies, newspapers, radio and television stations including Terre Haute's WTHI, WTHI-FM and WTHI-TV, and a great deal of real estate.

In recent years, however, as the family has concentrated primarily on the Speedway and racing-related businesses, they have slowly begun to divest themselves of some of Hulman's real estate holdings and "non-core" businesses, such as Wabash Valley Broadcasting, their radio and television holding company, which was sold to Emmis Communications in 1997. Emmis sold WTHI-TV and several of their other television stations to LIN TV Corporation in 2005.

Wabash Valley Broadcasting was originally started by Terre Haute, IN. attorney Raymond J. Kearns, whom was the president of WVB.   Shortly after Wabash Valley Broadcasting was incorporated, Anton "Tony" Hulman, Jr.  became a stockholder.   The company (Wabash Valley Broadcasting) started radio station WTHI-AM, which went on air January 1948 as an ABC affiliate.  Hulman later headed a small group of men who purchased the holdings of all original shareholders.   
Hulman & Co. then sold Wabash Valley Broadcasting to Emmis Broadcasting in a $90 million deal, Wabash Valley Broadcasting consisted of television station WTHI, radio stations WTHI-FM, WTHI-AM and WWVR-FM as well as television station WFTX in Fort Myers, FL.

One such property that the family owned for years that became the subject of much speculation and scorn was the land occupied by the former Terre Haute House hotel, which stood at the northeast corner of Seventh Street and Wabash Avenue in Terre Haute (the historic former "Crossroads of America" junction of U.S. Highways 40 and 41). Hulman purchased the hotel in 1959 and closed it to the public in 1970. Noted for the rich and famous (as well as infamous) who stayed there during the hotel's early years, the hotel was the target of numerous attempts at revitalization between 1970 and 2005, with the city of Terre Haute taking a purchase option on the property in 2004 in an effort to finally make something happen. None came to fruition, and in the fall of 2005, the Hulman family (through Terre Haute Realty Corp.) sold the hotel and two other historic buildings to a limited liability corporation, Seventh & Wabash, LLC, owned by Terre Haute developer, Greg Gibson, who demolished the structures for redevelopment. A new hotel, the Hilton Garden Inn – Terre Haute House, opened in the fall of 2007.

Namesake grandson carries on the Speedway tradition

Hulman's grandson, Anton Hulman "Tony" George, is the former president and CEO of the Speedway and the Indy Racing League.

Tidbits and trivia

 The call letters for Hulman's WTHI television and radio stations have been, on occasion, said to stand for "With Tony Hulman's Interest," although it seems more likely that the letters stand for Terre Haute, Indiana.
 Most of the construction and improvement projects at the Indianapolis Motor Speedway during the Hulman years were "handshake deals," done without a contract. Hulman preferred to do it that way, always pointing out that he wasn't in it for the money; he just wanted to deliver the best racing experience possible.
 He was a member of Theta Chi fraternity during his time at Indiana State University
 Hulman joined a number of other successful businessmen by appearing in magazine advertisements for Lord Calvert Canadian Whisky under its slogan "for men of distinction." The ad became the foundation for a 1956 collage by Jess Collins called "Lord Pervert," which mocks Whittaker Chambers.
 A portion of Interstate 70 east of Indianapolis, Indiana has been designated the "Anton Tony Hulman Jr. Memorial Way".

See also
List of ambulance drivers during World War I

References

Further reading
 Who Was Who on Screen. Third edition. By Evelyn Mack Truitt. New York City: R.R. Bowker, 1983.
 Biography Index. A cumulative index to biographical material in books and magazines. Volume 21: September 1995 – August 1996. New York: H. W. Wilson Co., 1996.
 American National Biography. 24 volumes. Edited by John A. Garraty and Mark C. Carnes. New York: Oxford University Press, 1999.

External links 
 

1901 births
1977 deaths
American food industry businesspeople
American football ends
American motorsport people
Auto racing executives
Hulman-George_family
Indianapolis 500
International Motorsports Hall of Fame inductees
Rose–Hulman Fightin' Engineers football coaches
Yale Bulldogs football players
Yale School of Engineering & Applied Science alumni
Lawrenceville School alumni
Worcester Academy alumni
Businesspeople from Indianapolis
Sportspeople from Terre Haute, Indiana
Players of American football from Indiana
Philanthropists from Indiana
20th-century American businesspeople
20th-century American philanthropists